Vellore Vallimalai is a village in Katpadi taluk ( Vellore North Taluk ) of Vellore district, Tamil Nadu, India. It is known for Subramaniyar temple, a Hindu temple for Murugan. 
().

 is the place where , the daughter of Lord Vishnu and Lakshmi was born (according to legends, via the sweat drop from Lakshmi that fell on the grass at this place, and later on consumed by a female deer, thereafter  was born to the Deer). Raised up by the Chief of the tribe,  grew up to be a beautiful damsel. They elope from 
 and get married, settle down at Thanigai (Thirutthani).  

There is another place by name Vellimalai, near Kanyakumari and Nagercoil bordering with Kerala State, which subscribes to the same story, where in Valli was born to marry with Murugan in a love marriage. 

There is the Thiruppugazh aashramam atop , where the tradition of  lives on. The temple is one of the monuments of national importance in Tamil Nadu.

Another legend about  how  came to the  involves  lord Vishnu. In the foot of hill  is the Sri Thenvenkatachalapathy temple, where Vishnu's moorthy looks like a saint. According to history when Vishnu was in deep meditation, Lakshmi came in the form of a deer and she plays in front of him. At that time Vishnu's meditation was disturbed and he saw that deer. Due to his holy glory a beautiful daughter was born. Both of them left their daughter for the sake of their devotee king. After that, the king found this infant in a Vaḷḷikiḻaṅku field so, she was called  .
In  the  temple, there is an idol which is Swayambu murthi. There is a belief that childless devotees will get children after praying in this temple.

Vallimalai Jain caves 

Western Ganga dynasty king Raja Mallan-I carved caves for Jain monks who lived here to spread their religion in Tamilakam.

References 

Villages in Vellore district
Murugan temples in Tamil Nadu